NZR K class could refer to one of these classes of locomotives operated by New Zealand Railways:

 NZR K class (1877)
 NZR K class (1932)